The Kingdom of Aksum, also known as the Kingdom of Axum or the Aksumite Empire, was a kingdom centered in Northeast Africa and South Arabia from Classical antiquity to the Middle Ages. Based primarily in what is now northern Ethiopia, and spanning modern-day Eritrea, northern Djibouti, and eastern Sudan, it extended at its height into much of southern Arabia during the reign of King Kaleb.

Axum served as the kingdom's capital for many centuries but relocated to Jarma in the 9th century due to declining trade connections and recurring external invasions. Emerging from the earlier Dʿmt civilization, the kingdom was likely founded in the early 1st century. Pre-Aksumite culture developed in part due to a South Arabian influence, evident in the use of the Ancient South Arabian script and the practice of Ancient Semitic religion. However, the Geʽez script came into use by the 4th century, and as the kingdom became a major power on the trade route between Rome and India, it entered the Greco-Roman cultural sphere and began to use Greek as a lingua franca. It is through this that the Kingdom of Aksum adopted Christianity as the state religion in the mid-4th century, under Ezana of Axum. Following their Christianization, the Aksumites ceased construction of stelae.  

The Kingdom of Aksum was considered one of the ancient world's four great powers of the 3rd century by Persian prophet Mani, alongside Persia, Rome, and China. Beginning with the reign of Endubis, Aksum minted its own coins, which have been excavated in locations as far as Caesarea and southern India. The kingdom continued to expand throughout late antiquity, conquering Meroe for a short period of time, from whom it inherited the Greek exonym "Ethiopia". Aksumite dominance in the Red Sea culminated during the reign of Kaleb of Axum, who, at the behest of the Byzantine Empire Justin I, invaded the Himyarite Kingdom in Yemen in order to end the persecution of Christians perpetrated by the Jewish king Dhu Nuwas. With the annexation of Himyar, the Kingdom of Aksum was at its largest territorial extent. However, the territory was lost in the Aksumite–Persian wars.

The kingdom's slow decline had begun by the 7th century, at which point currency ceased to be minted. The Persian (and later Muslim) presence in the Red Sea caused Aksum to suffer economically, and the population of the city of Axum shrank. Alongside environmental and internal factors, this has been suggested as the reason for its decline. Aksum's final three centuries are considered a dark age, and through uncertain circumstances, the kingdom collapsed around 960. Despite its position as one of the foremost empires of late antiquity, the Kingdom of Aksum fell into obscurity as Ethiopia remained isolated throughout the Middle Ages.

History

Origins
Before the establishment of Axum, the Tigray plateau of northern Ethiopia was home to a kingdom known as Dʿmt. Archaeological evidence shows that the kingdom was influenced by Sabaeans from modern-day Yemen; scholarly consensus had previously been that Sabaeans had been the founders of Semitic civilization in Ethiopia, though this has now been refuted, and their influence is considered to have been minor. The Sabaean presence likely lasted only for a matter of decades, but their influence on later Aksumite civilization included the adoption of Ancient South Arabian script, which developed into Geʽez script, and Ancient Semitic religion.

The first historical mention of Axum comes from the Periplus of the Erythraean Sea, a trading guide which likely dates to the mid-1st century AD. Axum is mentioned alongside Adulis and Ptolemais of the Hunts as lying within the realm of Zoskales. The area is described as a primarily producing ivory, as well as tortoise shells. Zoskales is also said to have been "acquainted with Greek literature", indicating that Greco-Roman influence was already present at this time. It is evident from the Periplus that, even at this early stage of its history, Axum played a role in the transcontinental trade route between Rome and India.

Empire

The Kingdom of Axum was a trading empire with its hub in Eritrea and northern Ethiopia. It existed approximately 100–940 AD, growing from the Iron Age proto-Axumite period c. fourth century BC to achieve prominence by the first century AD.

According to the Book of Axum, the kingdom's first capital, Mazaber, was built by Itiyopis, son of Cush. The capital was later moved to Axum in northern Ethiopia. The Kingdom used the name "Ethiopia" as early as the fourth century.

The Empire of Axum at times extended across most of present-day Eritrea, northern Ethiopia, Western Yemen — which it invaded utilizing the dhow designs of Egypt — and parts of eastern Sudan. The capital city of the empire was Axum, now in northern Ethiopia. Today a smaller community, the city of Axum was once a bustling metropolis, cultural and economic hub. Two hills and two streams lie on the east and west expanses of the city; perhaps providing the initial impetus for settling this area. Along the hills and plain outside the city, the Aksumites had cemeteries with elaborate grave stones called stelee or obelisks. Other important cities included Yeha, Hawulti-Melazo, Matara, Adulis, and Qohaito, the last three of which are now in Eritrea. By the reign of Endubis in the late third century, it had begun minting its own currency and was named by Mani as one of the four great powers of his time along with the Sasanian Empire, Roman Empire, and  China. The Axumites adopted Christianity as the state religion in 325 or 328 AD under King Ezana, and Axum was the first state ever to use the image of the cross on its coins.

Around the 3rd century (possibly c. 240–c. 260), the Aksumites led by Sembrouthes were victorious over the Sesea, with Sesea becoming a tributary of the Kingdom of Aksum. Around 330, Ezana of Aksum led his army into the Kingdom of Meroë, conquering and sacking the town itself. A large stone monument was left there, and the conquest is also related on Ezana Stone.

King Kaleb

Around 525, King Kaleb sent an expedition to Yemen against the Jewish Himyarite king Dhu Nuwas, who was persecuting the Christian community there.
For nearly half a century south Arabia would become an Ethiopian protectorate under Abraha and his son Masruq. Dhu Nuwas was deposed and killed and Kaleb appointed a Christian Himyarite, Esimiphaios ("Sumuafa Ashawa"), as his viceroy. However, around 530 this viceroy was deposed by the Aksumite general Abraha with support of Ethiopians who had settled in Yemen. Kaleb sent two expeditions against Abraha, but both were decisively defeated. Kaleb did not pursue the matter further, and recognized Abraha as his new viceroy.

After Abraha's death, his son Masruq Abraha continued the Aksumite vice-royalty in Yemen, resuming payment of tribute to Aksum. However, his half-brother Ma'd-Karib revolted.

After being denied by Justinian, Ma'd-Karib sought help from Khosrow I, the Sassanid Persian Emperor, thus triggering the Aksumite–Persian wars. Khosrow I sent a small fleet and army under commander Vahrez to depose the king of Yemen. The war culminated with the Siege of Sana'a, capital of Aksumite Yemen.
After its fall in 570, and Masruq death, Ma'd-Karib's son, Saif, was put on the throne.

In 575, the war resumed again, after Saif was killed by Aksumites. The Persian general Vahrez led another army of 8000, ending Axum rule in Yemen and becoming hereditary governor of Yemen. According to Munro-Hay, these wars may have been Aksum's swan-song as a great power, with an overall weakening of Aksumite authority and over-expenditure in money and manpower.

According to Ethiopian traditions, Kaleb eventually abdicated and retired to a monastery. It is also possible that Ethiopia was affected by the Plague of Justinian around this time.

Aksum, though weakened, remained a strong empire and trading power until the rise of Islam in the 7th century. However, unlike the relations between the Islamic powers and Christian Europe, Aksum (see Sahama), was on good terms with its Islamic neighbours and provided shelter to Muhammad's early followers around 615. Nevertheless, as early as 640, Umar sent a naval expedition against Adulis, the Expedition of Alqammah bin Mujazziz, but it was eventually defeated.

In the 7th century, early Muslims from Mecca sought refuge from Quraysh persecution by travelling to the kingdom, a journey known in Islamic history as the First Hijrah. However the religion was not established until the arrival of the Ottomans in the 15th century.

Aksumite naval power also declined throughout the period, though in 702 Aksumite pirates were able to invade the Hejaz and occupy Jeddah. In retaliation, however, Sulayman ibn Abd al-Malik was able to take the occupied parts back and the Dahlak Archipelago from Aksum, which became Muslim from that point on.

Decline
After a second golden age in the early 6th century the empire began to decline in the mid 6th century, eventually ceasing its production of coins in the early 7th century. Around this same time, the Aksumite population was forced to go farther inland to the highlands for protection, abandoning Aksum as the capital. Arab writers of the time continued to describe Ethiopia (no longer referred to as Aksum) as an extensive and powerful state, though they had lost control of most of the coast and their tributaries. While land was lost in the north, it was gained in the south; and, though Ethiopia was no longer an economic power, it still attracted Arab merchants. The capital was then moved south to a new location called Ku'bar or Jarmi. The Arab writer Ya'qubi was the first to describe the new Aksumite capital. The capital was probably located in southern Tigray or Angot, however the exact location of this city is currently unknown.

Eventually, the Rashidun Caliphate took control of the Red Sea and Egypt by 646, pushing Aksum into economic isolation. Northwest of Aksum, in modern-day Sudan, the Christian states of Nobatia, Makuria and Alodia lasted until the 13th century before being overrun by Bedouin tribes and the Funj Sultanate. Aksum, isolated, nonetheless still remained Christian.

Famine is noted in Ethiopia in the ninth century. The patriarchates James (819–830) and Joseph (830–849) of Alexandria attribute Ethiopia's condition to war, plague, and inadequate rains. Under the reign of Degna Djan, during the 9th century, the empire kept expanding south, and sent troops into the modern-day region of Kaffa, while at the same time undertaking missionary activity into Angot.

Local history holds that, around 960, a Jewish Queen named Yodit (Judith) or "Gudit" defeated the empire and burned its churches and literature. While there is evidence of churches being burned and an invasion around this time, her existence has been questioned by some western authors. Gudit sacked Aksum by destroying churches and buildings, persecuted Christians and committed Christian iconoclasm. Her origin has been debated among scholars. Some argued that she had a Jewish ethnicity or was from a southern region. According to one traditional account, she reigned for forty years and her dynasty lasted until 1137 AD, when it was overthrown by Mara Takla Haymanot, resulting in the inception of the Agaw-led Zagwe dynasty. 

Gudit's origin has been extensively debated. Scholars debate whether she was a Jew, an Agaw, a Beja, and an enslaved servant of an Aksumite emperor who wanted to lead pagans against Christianity. Others argued that she was a daughter of the king of Lasta, situated in Bugna. The Italian scholar Carlo Conti Rossini described her as a Bani al-Hamwiyah, while another source pointed to the Sidama people in the area called Sasu, probably south of the Blue Nile, where Aksumite rulers also obtained caravans for commodities of gold and coin, which are thought the main motive for Gudit's raid.

According to an oral tradition, Gudit rose to power after she killed the Beta Israel emperor and then reigned for 40 years. She brought her Jewish army from Gondar and Lake Tana to orchestrate the pillage against Aksum and its countryside. She was determined to destroy all members of the Aksumite dynasty, palaces, churches and monuments in Tigray. Her notorious deeds are still recounted by peasants inhabiting northern Ethiopia. Large ruins, standing stones and stelae are found in the area.

Around 960, she attacked Aksum, demolishing churches (the Church of Our Lady Mary of Zion was partially demolished), monasteries, buildings and committing Christian iconoclasm. Gudit also killed the last emperor of Aksum, possibly Dil Na'od, while other accounts say Dil Na'od went into exile in Shewa, protected by Christians. He begged assistance from a ruler named King George of Makuria, which remained unanswered. She was said to have been succeeded by Dagna-Jan, whose throne name was Anbasa Wudem. Her reign was marked by the displacement of the Aksumite population into the south.

According to one Ethiopian traditional account, she reigned for forty years and her dynasty was eventually overthrown by Mara Tekla Haymanot in 1137 AD, who ushered in the formation of the Zagwe dynasty by bearing children with a descendant of the last Aksumite emperor, Dil Na'od.

Another possibility of decline is that the Aksumite power was ended by a southern pagan queen named Bani al-Hamwiyah, possibly of the tribe al-Damutah or Damoti (Damot). It is clear from contemporary sources that a female usurper did indeed rule the country at this time, and that her reign ended some time before 1003. After a short Dark Age, the Aksumite Empire was succeeded by the Zagwe dynasty in the 11th or 12th century (most likely around 1137), although limited in size and scope. However, Yekuno Amlak, who killed the last Zagwe king and founded the modern Solomonic dynasty around 1270 traced his ancestry and his right to rule from the last emperor of Aksum, Dil Na'od. It should be mentioned that the end of the Aksumite Empire didn't mean the end of Aksumite culture and traditions; for example, the architecture of the Zagwe dynasty at Lalibela and Yemrehana Krestos Church shows heavy Aksumite influence.

Climate change hypothesis 
Climatic change and trade isolation have also been claimed as large reasons for the decline of the culture. The local subsistence base was substantially augmented by a climatic shift during the 1st century AD that reinforced the spring rains, extended the rainy season from 3 1/2 to six or seven months, vastly improved the surface and subsurface water supply, doubled the length of the growing season, and created an environment comparable to that of modern central Ethiopia (where two crops can be grown per annum without the aid of irrigation). This appears to explain how one of the marginal agricultural environments of Ethiopia was able to support the demographic base that made this far flung commercial empire possible. It may also explain why no Aksumite rural settlement expansion into the moister, more fertile, and naturally productive lands of Begemder or Lasta can be verified during the heyday of Aksumite power. As international profits from the exchange network declined, Aksum lost its ability to control its own raw material sources and that network collapsed. The already persistent environmental pressure of a large population to maintain a high level of regional food production had to be intensified. The result was a wave of soil erosion that began on a local scale c. 650 and attained catastrophic proportions after 700. Presumably complex socio-economic inputs compounded the problem. These are traditionally reflected in declining maintenance, deterioration and partial abandonment of marginal crop land, shifts to destructive pastoral exploitation, and eventual, wholesale and irreversible land degradation. This syndrome was possibly accelerated by an apparent decline in rainfall reliability beginning 730–760, with the presumed result that an abbreviated modern growing season was reestablished during the 9th century.

Foreign relations, trade, and economy

Covering parts of what is now northern Ethiopia and southern and eastern Eritrea, Aksum was deeply involved in the trade network between the Indian subcontinent and the Mediterranean (Rome, later Byzantium), exporting ivory, tortoise shell, gold and emeralds, and importing silk and spices. Aksum's access to both the Red Sea and the Upper Nile enabled its strong navy to profit in trade between various African (Nubia), Arabian (Yemen), and Indian states.

The main exports of Aksum were, as would be expected of a state during this time, agricultural products. The land was much more fertile during the time of the Aksumites than now, and their principal crops were grains such as wheat and barley. The people of Aksum also raised cattle, sheep, and camels. Wild animals were also hunted for things such as ivory and rhinoceros horns. They traded with Roman traders as well as with Egyptian and Persian merchants. The empire was also rich with gold and iron deposits. These metals were valuable to trade, but another mineral was also widely traded: salt. Salt was abundant in Aksum and was traded quite frequently.

It benefited from a major transformation of the maritime trading system that linked the Roman Empire and India. This change took place around the start of the 1st century. The older trading system involved coastal sailing and many intermediary ports. The Red Sea was of secondary importance to the Persian Gulf and overland connections to the Levant. Starting around 100 BC a route from Egypt to India was established, making use of the Red Sea and using monsoon winds to cross the Arabian Sea directly to southern India. By about 100 AD, the volume of traffic being shipped on this route had eclipsed older routes. Roman demand for goods from southern India increased dramatically, resulting in greater number of large ships sailing down the Red Sea from Roman Egypt to the Arabian Sea and India.

The Kingdom of Aksum was ideally located to take advantage of the new trading situation. Adulis soon became the main port for the export of African goods, such as ivory, incense, gold, slaves, and exotic animals. In order to supply such goods the kings of Aksum worked to develop and expand an inland trading network. A rival, and much older trading network that tapped the same interior region of Africa was that of the Kingdom of Kush, which had long supplied Egypt with African goods via the Nile corridor. By the 1st century AD, however, Aksum had gained control over territory previously Kushite. The Periplus of the Erythraean Sea explicitly describes how ivory collected in Kushite territory was being exported through the port of Adulis instead of being taken to Meroë, the capital of Kush. During the 2nd and 3rd centuries AD the Kingdom of Aksum continued to expand their control of the southern Red Sea basin. A caravan route to Egypt was established which bypassed the Nile corridor entirely. Aksum succeeded in becoming the principal supplier of African goods to the Roman Empire, not least as a result of the transformed Indian Ocean trading system.

Society
The Aksumite population mostly consisted of Semitic-speaking people collectively known as the Habeshas. The Aksumite Empire also consisted of several other ethnic groups, inscriptions from the time of Ezana notes the "Barya" tribes who lived in the western part of the empire, which is believed to be the Nara people. The Aksumites would frequently wage slave expeditions against these barya tribes. The Agaw people were also known to have lived in the southern frontiers of the kingdom and were typically employed in the Aksumite army.

Aksumites had a modified feudal system to farm the land.

Kings

The Aksumite kings had the official title  , meaning "king of kings."

Culture

The Empire of Aksum is notable for a number of achievements, such as its own alphabet, the Ge'ez script, which was eventually modified to include vowels, becoming an abugida. Furthermore, in the early times of the empire, around 1700 years ago, giant obelisks to mark emperors' (and nobles') tombs (underground grave chambers) were constructed, the most famous of which is the Obelisk of Aksum.

Under Emperor Ezana, Aksum adopted Christianity in place of its former polytheistic and Judaic religions around 325. This gave rise to the present day Ethiopian Orthodox Tewahedo Church (only granted autonomy from the Coptic Church in 1959), and Eritrean Orthodox Tewahdo Church (granted autonomy from the Ethiopian Orthodox church in 1993). Since the schism with Orthodoxy following the Council of Chalcedon (451), it has been an important Miaphysite church, and its scriptures and liturgy continue to be in Ge'ez.

Religion

Before its conversion to Christianity, the Aksumites practiced a polytheistic religion related to the religion practiced in southern Arabia. This included the use of the crescent-and-disc symbol used in southern Arabia and the northern horn. In the UNESCO sponsored General History of Africa French archaeologist Francis Anfray, suggests that the pagan Aksumites worshipped Astar, his son, Mahrem, and Beher.

Steve Kaplan argues that with Aksumite culture came a major change in religion, with only Astar remaining of the old gods, the others being replaced by what he calls a "triad of indigenous divinities, Mahrem, Beher and Medr." He also suggests that Aksum culture was significantly influenced by Judaism, saying that "The first carriers of Judaism reached Ethiopia between the reign of Queen of Sheba BC and conversion to Christianity of King Ezana in the fourth century AC." He believes that although Ethiopian tradition suggests that these were present in large numbers, that "A relatively small number of texts and individuals dwelling in the cultural, economic, and political center could have had a considerable impact." and that "their influence was diffused throughout Ethiopian culture in its formative period. By the time Christianity took hold in the fourth century, many of the originally Hebraic-Jewish elements had been adopted by much of the indigenous population and were no longer viewed as foreign characteristics. Nor were they perceived as in conflict with the acceptance of Christianity."

Before converting to Christianity, King Ezana II's coins and inscriptions show that he might have worshiped the gods Astar, Beher, Meder/Medr, and Mahrem. Another of Ezana's inscriptions is clearly Christian and refers to "the Father, the Son, and the Holy Spirit". Around 324 AD the King Ezana II was converted to Christianity by his teacher Frumentius, the founder of the Ethiopian Orthodox Church. Frumentius taught the emperor while he was young, and it is believed that at some point staged the conversion of the empire. We know that the Aksumites converted to Christianity because in their coins they replaced the disc and crescent with the cross.  Frumentius was in contact with the Church of Alexandria, and was appointed Bishop of Ethiopia around the year 330. The Church of Alexandria never closely managed the affairs of the churches in Aksum, allowing them to develop their own unique form of Christianity. However, the Church of Alexandria probably did retain some influence considering that the churches of Aksum followed the Church of Alexandria into Oriental Orthodoxy by rejecting the Fourth Ecumenical Council of Chalcedon. Aksum is also the alleged home of the holy relic the Ark of the Covenant. The Ark is said to have been placed in the Church of Our Lady Mary of Zion by Menelik I for safekeeping.

Islam came in the 7th century at the reign of Ashama ibn-Abjar when the followers of Muhammed were persecuted by the ruling tribe and begun migrating after the first followers got asylum from the King many begun to migrate. All of them returned to Medina in 622.source?

Ethiopian sources
Ethiopian sources such as the Kebra Nagast and the Fetha Nagast describe Aksum as a Jewish Kingdom. The Kebra Nagast contains a narrative of how the Queen of Sheba/Queen Makeda of Ethiopia met King Solomon and traces Ethiopia's to Menelik I, her son by King Solomon of Israel. In its existing form, the Kebra Nagast is at least 700 years old and is considered by the Ethiopian Orthodox Tewahedo Church to be a reliable and historic work.

Coinage

The Empire of Aksum was one of the first African polities to issue its own coins, which bore legends in Ge'ez and Greek. From the reign of Endubis up to Armah (approximately 270 to 610), gold, silver and bronze coins were minted. Issuing coinage in ancient times was an act of great importance in itself, for it proclaimed that the Aksumite Empire considered itself equal to its neighbours. Many of the coins are used as signposts about what was happening when they were minted. An example being the addition of the cross to the coin after the conversion of the empire to Christianity. The presence of coins also simplified trade, and was at once a useful instrument of propaganda and a source of profit to the empire.

Architecture

Homely architecture

In general, elite Aksumite buildings such as palaces were constructed atop podia built of loose stones held together with mud-mortar, with carefully cut granite corner blocks which rebated back a few centimeters at regular intervals as the wall got higher, so the walls narrowed as they rose higher. These podia are often all that survive of Aksumite ruins. Above the podia, walls were generally built with alternating layers of loose stone (often whitewashed, like at Yemrehana Krestos Church) and horizontal wooden beams, with smaller round wooden beams set in the stonework often projecting out of the walls (these are called 'monkey heads') on the exterior and sometimes the interior. Both the podia and the walls above exhibited no long straight stretches but were indented at regular intervals so that any long walls consisted of a series of recesses and salients. This helped to strengthen the walls. Worked granite was used for architectural features including columns, bases, capitals, doors, windows, paving, water spouts (often shaped like lion heads) and so on, as well as enormous flights of stairs that often flanked the walls of palace pavilions on several sides. Doors and windows were usually framed by stone or wooden cross-members, linked at the corners by square 'monkey heads', though simple lintels were also used. Many of these Aksumite features are seen carved into the famous stelae as well as in the later rock hewn churches of Tigray and Lalibela.

Palaces usually consisted of a central pavilion surrounded by subsidiary structures pierced by doors and gates that provided some privacy (see Dungur for an example). The largest of these structures now known is the Ta'akha Maryam, which measured 120 × 80m, though as its pavilion was smaller than others discovered it is likely that others were even larger.

Some clay models of houses survive to give us an idea of what smaller dwellings were like. One depicts a round hut with a conical roof thatched in layers, while another depicts a rectangular house with rectangular doors and windows, a roof supported by beams that end in 'monkey heads', and a parapet and water spout on the roof. Both were found in Hawelti. Another depicts a square house with what appear to be layers of pitched thatch forming the roof.

Stelae
The stelae (hawilt/hawilti in local languages) are perhaps the most identifiable part of the Aksumite architectural legacy. These stone towers served to mark graves and represent a magnificent multi-storied palace. They are decorated with false doors and windows in typical Aksumite design. The largest of these towering obelisks would measure 33 meters high had it not fractured. The stelae have most of their mass out of the ground, but are stabilized by massive underground counter-weights. The stone was often engraved with a pattern or emblem denoting the king's or the noble's rank.

In literature

The Aksumite Empire is portrayed as the main ally of Byzantium in the Belisarius series by David Drake and Eric Flint published by Baen Books. The series takes place during the reign of Kaleb, who in the series was assassinated by the Malwa in 532 at the Ta'akha Maryam and succeeded by his youngest son Eon bisi Dakuen.

In the Elizabeth Wein series The Lion Hunters, Mordred and his family take refuge in Aksum after the fall of Camelot. Kaleb is the ruler in the first book; he passes his sovereignty onto his son Gebre Meskal, who rules during the Plague of Justinian.

Gallery

See also

 Abraha
 History of Ethiopia
 Mifsas Bahri
 Monumentum Adulitanum

Notes

References

Further reading
 
 
 </ref>

External links

 World History Encyclopedia – Kingdom of Axum
 
 Ethiopian Treasures – Queen of Sheba, Aksumite Kingdom – Aksum
 Ancient History Sourcebook: Accounts of Meröe, Kush, and Axum
 Aksum: UNESCO World Heritage Site
 The Ash Heap of History (Mises.org)

 
Former empires in Africa
Aksum
Aksum
Aksum
Countries in ancient Africa
Countries in medieval Africa
States and territories established in the 1st century
States and territories disestablished in the 960s
Christian states
Former kingdoms